Khan Bhankri (or simply Bhankri) is a village in the Dausa district of Rājasthān, India.

References

lucky 2610

Cities and towns in Dausa district
Former capital cities in India